Surya Pratap Shahi (born 23 December 1952) is a Member of 9th, 
11th, 13th, 17th Legislative Assembly of Uttar Pradesh and 18th Uttar Pradesh Assembly. Currently he is serving as Cabinet Minister in Uttar Pradesh Government with the portfolio of Agriculture, Agriculture Education and Agriculture Research. He has worked as the president of Uttar Pradesh state unit in the past. He is one of those distinguished BJP leaders who won election in 1985 despite sympathy wave after assassination of Indira Gandhi in 1984.

Early life
Shahi was born on 23 December 1952 in Pakahan Village of Deoria district of Uttar Pradesh, India in a Bhumihar Brahmin family. He got his early education from GIC Deoria. He completed his graduation from B.R.D. Post Graduate College. Shahi got his LLB degree from Banaras Hindu University, Varanasi in 1974. His father Rajendra Kishor Shahi was District Sanchalak of Rashtriya Swayamsevak Sangh (RSS), who introduced him to the RSS at a very early age. Shahi was politically active since his student days. He contested and won the election of the student union in BHU. His uncle Ravindra Kishor Shahi was State President of Bhartiya Jana Sangh and a minister in the Uttar Pradesh government from 1977 to 1979. Shahi was married in 1973 to Rani Shahi. He has three children- a son and two daughters.

Political career
Shahi contested the assembly election of Uttar Pradesh for first time in the year 1980. However, he got elected for first time as MLA from the 'Kasia' assembly seat in 1985. Second time he won the election was in 1991 and became the Minister of State for Home in the Uttar Pradesh government. After completing one year in the government he was elevated to the position of Cabinet Minister with the portfolio of Health and Family Welfare. In the year 1996, he again got elected as MLA. Surya Pratap Shahi held the office of Cabinet Minister in Uttar Pradesh government between 1997 and 2002 with the portfolio of Excise and Liquor Prohibition and currently he is a cabinet minister in Uttar Pradesh Government with the portfolio of Agriculture, Agriculture Education and Agriculture Research.

Posts held

References

State cabinet ministers of Uttar Pradesh
Bharatiya Janata Party politicians from Uttar Pradesh
Uttar Pradesh MLAs 2022–2027
Living people
People from Deoria district
Yogi ministry
1952 births